Normandy High School may refer to:

 Normandy High School (Missouri)
 Normandy High School (Ohio)